Stenodus leucichthys is a species of freshwater whitefish in the family Salmonidae. In the strict sense its natural distribution is restricted to the Caspian Sea basin, and it is known as beloribitsa (literally meaning "the fish that is white" in Russian). The beloribitsa is now considered extinct in the wild, but survives in cultured stocks. The nelma (Stenodus nelma), a more widespread species of Eurasian and North America, is sometimes considered its subspecies.

Systematics 
Alternatively, the name Stenodus leucichtys has been used in a broader sense, referring to a widespread species composed of two subspecies. In addition to the landlocked subspecies Stenodus leucichthys leucichthys, it comprises the nelma, Stenodus leucichthys nelma  (Pallas, 1773) which lives in Eurasian and North American rivers of the Arctic basin. Nelma, also known as the sheefish or inconnu, is currently often considered as a distinct species Stenodus nelma.

At a higher level, the genus Stenodus is not phylogenetically distinct from the broader lake whitefish genus Coregonus, although it is phenotypically characterized by a specialized predator morphology.

Description and status 
The fish has a large mouth with a protruding lower jaw and a high and pointed dorsal fin. It is generally silver in color with a green, blue or brown back. The meat is white, flaky and somewhat oily. The fish eat plankton for their first year of life and then become predators of smaller fish.

Following the construction of dams and hydropower reservoirs, the migration and natural reproduction has been impeded, and the taxon is now considered as extinct in the wild by the IUCN. The stock however survives in hatcheries and some populations are maintained by stocking.

References

External links 
 Stenodus leucichthys nelma Illustration of the sister species by N.N. Kondrakov. NOAA Photo Library.

Stenodus
Freshwater fish of the Arctic
Fish described in 1772
Taxa named by Johann Anton Güldenstädt